Franz Josef / Waiau is a small town in the West Coast region of the South Island of New Zealand. The Waiho River runs from the Franz Josef Glacier to the south, through the town, and into the Tasman Sea to the north-west.

Name
Local Māori called the area , which means swirling waters. 
In the 1860s Sir Julius von Haast named the Franz Josef Glacier in honour of the Emperor of Austria Franz Josef I of Austria. The town Franz Josef was then named after the glacier.

Following the passage of the Ngāi Tahu Claims Settlement Act 1998, the name of the town was officially altered to Franz Josef / Waiau.

Geography

Flood protection 
The bed of the Waiho (Waiau) River has significantly risen over the years, and increased rainfall and snow melt from the retreating glacier has caused the river's water flow to vary greatly. The riverbed is currently predicted to rise 2 m every 10 years, and in 30 years will be higher than the town itself. A flood in February 2016 caused $30 million of damage. In a severe rain storm on 26 March 2019,  of rain fell and the bridge over the Waiho, the only road connection to south Westland, was destroyed. The town was flooded and hundreds were evacuated. The bridge and one abutment was rebuilt and the road link reopened after 18 days at a cost of NZ$6m.

Flood protection was deemed a priority for the township of Franz Josef, and a $24m package was approved by the Government in July 2020, as part of the COVID-19 economic stimulus package. The work included $18m for rock embankments on the north and south banks, and $3.8m to raise the level of the highway bridge. The work had not begun as of January 2021, leading to criticism from National MP Maureen Pugh and Regional Council head Allan Birchfield. MP Damien O'Connor said "piling more rocks around the river" was not a long-term solution.

One proposal made in a 2017 report was to remove embankments on the river's southern bank, allowing it to widen and flood several thousand hectares of farmland. This would affect 82 people and 40 properties, who would need compensation by central government. In September 2021, $400,000 of emergency work was approved on the southern bank stopbank.

Another proposal for the future of Franz Josef is to relocate the entire town away from the flood danger and the alpine fault to the shore of Lake Mapourika, 10 km north of the town. The estimated cost for this is $300–$600 million, or as high as $1 billion.

Demographics 
It is part of the wider Westland Glaciers-Bruce Bay statistical area.

The Franz Josef settlement had a usual resident population of 483 at the 2018 New Zealand census, an increase of 156 people (47.7%) since the 2013 census, and an increase of 177 people (57.8%) since the 2006 census. There were 243 males and 237 females, giving a sex ratio of 1.03 males per female. Of the total population, 48 people (9.9%) were aged under 15, 219 people (45.3%) were 15 to 29, 210 people were 30 to 64 (43.4%), and six people (1.2%) were 65 or over.

In terms of ethnicity, 60.2% of residents were European, 7.5% were Māori, 6.8% were Pacific peoples, 23.6% were Asian, and 6.2% were other ethnicities (totals add to more than 100% since people could identify with multiple ethnicities).

Although Franz Josef has only 330 local ratepayers, it regularly received 600,000 tourist visitors a year until the COVID-19 epidemic restricted travel to New Zealand.

Westland Glaciers-Bruce Bay statistical area

The statistical area of Westland Glaciers-Bruce Bay, which covers 3,057 square kilometres, had a population of 1,074 at the 2018 New Zealand census, an increase of 198 people (22.6%) since the 2013 census, and an increase of 111 people (11.5%) since the 2006 census. There were 477 households. There were 549 males and 528 females, giving a sex ratio of 1.04 males per female. The median age was 31.3 years (compared with 37.4 years nationally), with 111 people (10.3%) aged under 15 years, 378 (35.2%) aged 15 to 29, 525 (48.9%) aged 30 to 64, and 57 (5.3%) aged 65 or older.

Ethnicities were 69.6% European/Pākehā, 7.5% Māori, 4.7% Pacific peoples, 17.0% Asian, and 6.4% other ethnicities (totals add to more than 100% since people could identify with multiple ethnicities).

The proportion of people born overseas was 48.0%, compared with 27.1% nationally.

Although some people objected to giving their religion, 53.1% had no religion, 33.0% were Christian, 3.9% were Hindu, 0.3% were Muslim, 2.0% were Buddhist and 2.0% had other religions.

Of those at least 15 years old, 222 (23.1%) people had a bachelor or higher degree, and 102 (10.6%) people had no formal qualifications. The median income was $33,000, compared with $31,800 nationally. The employment status of those at least 15 was that 792 (82.2%) people were employed full-time, 69 (7.2%) were part-time, and 12 (1.2%) were unemployed.

Tourism
The town is within the Westland Tai Poutini National Park.

Franz Josef offers many accommodation options for the up to 2,000 people staying overnight during the main season, ranging from hotels and motels to holiday houses, camping sites and backpacker accommodation. Other amenities include a petrol station, small but busy heliport and a number of restaurants and shops.
The village is connected to the Franz Josef Glacier valley via walking tracks and a small sealed road leading into the valley from the highway just south of the village.

Franz Josef village is also home to the West Coast Wildlife Centre, a public/private partnership with the Department of Conservation and local iwi, dedicated to the hatching and incubation of the world's two rarest species of kiwi, the rowi and Haast tokoeka. The centre is open from 8.30am daily and offers a 24-hour general pass as well as VIP guided backstage pass tours for behind-the-scenes tours of its kiwi hatching and rearing facilities.

Churches

St James Church

St James Church is a small Anglican church in a bush setting overlooking the Waiho River to the south of Franz Josef township, within the Ross and South Westland Parish. Opened in 1931, the church is notable for its use of clear glass windows behind the altar giving views of the river, mountains and bush beyond. At times during the church's history, Franz Josef Glacier has been visible through the altar window. St James Church was designated as a category 1 historic place by Heritage New Zealand in 1990.

Our Lady of the Alps

The church was dedicated, blessed and opened on 23 December 1951. It is similar in style to Swiss mountain churches with a steeply pitched roof to shed snow, and has prominent buttresses. The porch includes two St Bernard stained-glass windows, one depicting a coil of rope with an ice pick and ski pole crossed, and the other crossed skis and a shield with a flask of brandy and a loaf of bread.

Mass is held at Our Lady of the Alps weekly, on the first and third Sundays and second fourth and fifth Saturdays of each month.

Transport and infrastructure 
State Highway 6 passes through the town.

Westpower owns and operates the local distribution network in Franz Josef, with electricity supplied from the national grid at Hokitika via Westpower's 33,000-volt Hokitika to Fox Glacier line.

The Westland District Council owns and operates reticulated water and wastewater systems in the town.

Education

The school roll has fluctuated between 12 and 57, and is largely driven by families moving to or from Franz Josef to work in tourism. In 2002 the roll was 45, dropping to 12 in 2012, increasing to 51 in 2018, and dropping to 34 in 2022 as tourism businesses closed in response to the COVID-19 pandemic. The school has twice been reduced to a single teacher when student numbers have dropped below 25.

References

External links

Westland District
Populated places in the West Coast, New Zealand
Franz Joseph I of Austria